Starmania is a Canadian-French cyberpunk rock opera written in 1976 with music by Michel Berger and book and lyrics by Luc Plamondon. It debuted in 1978 with a studio recording of the songs, before premiering on stage in 1979. Several of its songs have passed into mainstream Francophone pop culture, and helped original cast members Daniel Balavoine and Diane Dufresne to rise in popularity in France; it is now considered one of the most famous rock operas in French history.

An English version with lyrics by Tim Rice, titled Tycoon, premiered with the release of a studio recording in 1992, which starred Kim Carnes, Celine Dion, Nina Hagen, Peter Kingsbery, Cyndi Lauper, Willy DeVille, Kevin Robinson and Tom Jones.

A comeback tour, directed by Thomas Jolly, Nicolas Ghesquière and Victor Le Masne (Housse de Racket), was announced in 2020 and set to premiere in France on November 11, 2021. It was postponed to November 8, 2022, because of the COVID-19 pandemic

Genesis

In 1978, its first recording was released (in French), sub-titled Starmania, ou la passion de Johnny Rockfort selon les évangiles télévisés ("Starmania, or the Passion of Johnny Rockfort According to the Televised Gospels") with the leading roles filled by Daniel Balavoine, Claude Dubois, Diane Dufresne, Nanette Workman, France Gall, Eric Esteve and Fabienne Thibeault.

In 1979 the show was given its theatrical debut in Paris, starring Balavoine, Étienne Chicot, Dufresne, Gall, and Thibeault, followed by Canadian productions in 1980 and 1986 and French revivals in 1988 and throughout the 1990s. The 1980 Canadian production had a cast that included France Castel, Louise Forestier, Gilles Valiquette, and Martine St-Clair.

Céline Dion recorded several songs from the musical on her 1991 album Dion chante Plamondon.

In 1992, an English version of the show was created with the release of the album Tycoon, with lyrics by Tim Rice, and starring Kim Carnes, Celine Dion, Nina Hagen, Peter Kingsbery, Cyndi Lauper, Willy Deville, Kevin Robinson and Tom Jones in the principal roles on the recording. The American premiere of Tycoon, with English lyrics, was produced at the UTEP Dinner Theatre in El Paso, Texas in 1996, with Plamondon in attendance. It was alternated on stage in Paris with the French version for a few months.

In 2004, Starmania was honoured as a MasterWork by the Audio-Visual Preservation Trust of Canada.

Brief plot outline
In the near future, Monopolis, the capital of the recently united Occident, is terrorized by the Black Stars, a gang headed by Johnny Rockfort, who dances to the tune of Sadia, a student-agitator, originally from the upper crust, who cross-dresses at night and descends into the underground to hand out orders. They meet at the Underground Café, under the amused gaze of Marie-Jeanne, the robotic waitress.

Above this underground café stands the Golden Tower, a 121-floor building, the top of which is the office of Zéro Janvier, a billionaire getting into politics by running for the presidency of the Occident. He bases his electoral campaign on a return to order and on the construction of the new atomic world. Zéro Janvier thus becomes the sworn enemy of Johnny Rockfort and the Black Stars. It is in this framework that three parallel love affairs take shape and come undone: the impossible love of Marie-Jeanne for Ziggy, a young androgynous and mythomaniac record dealer; the sensational romance of Zéro Janvier and Stella Spotlight, a sex symbol who has just said farewell to the silver screen; and the passion of Johnny Rockfort and Cristal, a true nexus of the plot.

Cristal, the host and star of a TV show called “Starmania,” gets a call from Sadia offering her a clandestine interview with Johnny Rockfort, whose face no one knows. The get-together takes place at the Underground Café. For Cristal and Johnny, it is love at first sight. They go off together; therefore, Sadia has lost her hold over Johnny. Cristal decides to become the spokeswoman for the Black Stars, transmitting pirate messages by means of a neutron camera that lets her take over television frequencies.

Sadia, furious with jealousy, denounces Johnny and Cristal to Zéro Janvier on the evening that he is celebrating his engagement with Stella Spotlight at Naziland, a gigantic revolving discothèque above Monopolis. The Black Stars have chosen this very evening to set off a bomb in the Golden Tower.

Zéro Janvier's men hunt the Black Stars. Cristal is shot by Sadia and dies in Johnny's arms. The shadow of Johnny Rockfort will darken the victory of Zéro Janvier, elected president of the Occident. Terrorism against totalitarianism, two living forces in opposition, two dangers that threaten the world.

Stella Spotlight, revolted by power, ends her own life and returns to her dream of immortality; Marie-Jeanne, having had enough of the underground world, heads off in search of sunlight.

Notable songs

French version
 "Ouverture" ("Overture")
 "Quand on arrive en ville" ("When we Come to Town")
 "Complainte de la serveuse automate" ("Waitress Automaton's Lament")
 "Le blues du businessman" ("The Businessman's Blues")
 "Un garçon pas comme les autres" ("A Boy Like No Other")
 "La chanson de Ziggy" ("Ziggy's Song")
 "Monopolis"
 "Travesti" ("Transvestite")
 "Petite musique terrienne" ("Little Earth Song")
 "Ce soir on danse à Naziland" ("Tonight We Dance at Naziland")
 "Banlieue nord" ("North Suburb")
 "Les adieux d'un sex symbol" ("The Farewells of a Sex Symbol")
 "Les uns contre les autres" ("Against Each Others")
 "Quand on n'a plus rien à perdre" ("When We Have Nothing Left to Lose)"
 "Ego trip"
 "Le monde est stone" ("The World is Stone")
 "S.O.S. d'un terrien en détresse" ("S.O.S. of an Earthling in Distress")
 "Le rêve de Stella Spotlight" ("The Dream of Stella Spotlight")
 "Besoin d'amour" ("Need for Love")

English version
 "Overture"
 "The World Is Stone"
 "A Little Damage Done"
 "Only The Very Best"
 "You Get What You Deserve"
 "Ziggy"
 "Nobody Chooses"
 "Working Girl"
 "Tonight We Dance - (Extravagance!)"
 "Pollution's Child"
 "I Would Love To Change The World (The Businessman's Blues)
 "Farewell To A Sex Symbol"
 "Ego Trip"
 "You have to learn to live alone"

Albums (all in French unless stated)

1978 Starmania - Original Version
1979 Starmania - The Show (double album)
1980 Starmania Made in Quebec (LP)
1986 L'opéra rock Starmania (LP)
1988 Starmania 88
1992 Tycoon - (in English), also released as Starmania - Version anglaise
1994 Starmania - Mogador 94
1998 Starmania - 20th Anniversary (double CD)

References

External links
 Official site

1979 musicals
Canadian musicals
Musicals by Tim Rice
Rock operas
Science fiction musicals
Sung-through musicals